3-Methylhistidine (3-MH) is a post-translationally modified amino acid which is excreted in human urine. Urinary concentration of 3-methylhistidine is a biomarker for skeletal muscle protein breakdown in humans who have been subject to muscle injury. Urinary 3-methylhistidine concentrations are also elevated from consumption of soy-based products and meat, particularly chicken.

Biochemistry
3-Methylhistidine is a metabolic product that is produced in the body via the enzymatic methylation of histidine during peptide bond synthesis and the methylation of actin and myosin.

Detection in body fluids
The normal concentration of 3-methylhistidine in the urine of healthy adult humans has been detected and quantified in a range of  micromoles per millimole (μmol/mmol) of creatinine, with most studies reporting the average urinary concentration between 15–20 μmol/mmol of creatinine. The average concentration of 3-methylhistidine in human blood plasma has been detected and quantified at 2.85 micromolar (μM) with a range of  μM. The average concentration of 3-methylhistidine in human cerebrospinal fluid (CSF) has been detected and quantified at 3.82 μM with a range of  μM.

References

Imidazoles
Amino acid derivatives
Biomarkers